Saurita incerta is a moth in the subfamily Arctiinae. It was described by Francis Walker in 1856. It is found in Panama and Colombia.

References

Moths described in 1856
Saurita